Petryaevka is a railway station in Petryaevka, Nizhny Novgorod Oblast, Russia.

References 

Railway stations in Nizhny Novgorod Oblast